Coyoacán is a metro station along Line 3 of the Mexico City Metro. It is located in the Benito Juárez borough of Mexico City. It is at the intersection of Universidad and Coyoacán avenues. Right outside the station lies the Centro Coyoacán shopping mall, Radio Fórmula and Bancomer headquarters. It is also close to the Cineteca Nacional and Coyoacán district.

General information
The station logo depicts a coyote.  In fact, the Náhuatl word of Coyohuacan means place of coyotes.  According to early plans for Line 3, the station was originally destined to be known as Metro Bancomer, after Centro Bancomer, a banking center located above the station. This being a commercial name, metro authorities decided instead to name the station after nearby Avenida Coyoacán which leads to the popular downtown section of Coyoacán. The station opened on 30 August 1983 as part of a southward extension of the line.

This station has a cultural display, which houses temporary exhibits by art students.

Metro Coyoacán serves the Colonia del Valle and Xoco neighborhoods as well as Coyoacán.

Ridership

Nearby
Cineteca Nacional, cinematheque.

Exits
Northeast: Avenida Universidad and Real Mayorazgo street, Xoco
Southeast: Avenida Universidad and Real Mayorazgo street, Xoco
West: Martín Mendalde street, Colonia del Valle

References

External links 

Mexico City Metro stations in Benito Juárez, Mexico City
Coyoacan
Railway stations opened in 1983
1983 establishments in Mexico